Julissa (born Julia Isabel de Llano Macedo; 8 April 1944 in Mexico City, D.F., Mexico) is a Mexican actress, producer and singer. She is the daughter of radio and television personality Luis de Llano Palmer and actress Rita Macedo. Her children are: Benny Ibarra (a singer, musician, producer and actor) and Alejandro Ibarra (actor and singer); and her brother is a Televisa staff producer, Luis de Llano Macedo. She belongs to the so-called Golden Age of Mexican cinema.

Early life and career

Music
At age 14, Julissa began a singing career in a rock group called The Spitfires; it was formed by her brother, Luis. She won 2nd place in a radio competition before she was signed to a contract by CBS and she recorded rock albums from 1961 to 1964. She recorded a single, Corazón Salvaje / Te Necesito, released on Capitol Records in 1966. Julissa gave a new air to the original song "Teacher's Pet" by Doris Day, by reinterpreting it in the song "La favorita del profesor" ("The Teacher's Favorite").

Theatre
She started to act and then started a career where she is a leading theatre producer in Mexico bringing into the country well-known Broadway productions such as Jesus Christ Superstar, Grease, Joseph and the Amazing Technicolor Dreamcoat, Pippin.

She was a cast member of the 1975 Mexico production of The Rocky Horror Show; a young Aida Pierce was a chorus member.

Filmography

Films

Television

Awards

Music

Julissa was inducted into the Paseo de las Luminarias in 1987 for her work in movies, television, theater and the recording industry, joining her parents.  Her handprints would soon be joined by those of her brother; all four members of the De Llano-Macedo family have been honored in the Paseo.

References

External links
 
 Official Website

1944 births
Living people
Mexican telenovela actresses
Mexican television actresses
Mexican film actresses
Mexican stage actresses
Mexican women singers
Mexican telenovela producers
20th-century Mexican actresses
21st-century Mexican actresses
Actresses from Mexico City
Singers from Mexico City
People from Mexico City
Women television producers